James T. Brett (born December 22, 1949, Boston) is a former American politician who is the current president and CEO of The New England Council. He is also the Chairman of the President's Committee for People with Intellectual Disabilities.

Biography
Brett grew up in Savin Hill as one of six siblings, the eldest of whom, Jack, was born with an intellectual disability and died in 2010. In high school, Brett participated in a federal TRIO program called Upward Bound, which works with students to prepare them for college.

Prior to joining The New England Council, Brett represented the 14th Suffolk District from 1981 until his resignation in 1996. As a member of the House, Brett served as Chairman of the Joint Committee on Banks and Banking, the Joint Committee on Criminal Justice, the Joint Committee on Congressional Redistricting, the Joint Committee on Counties, the House Committee on Legislative Redistricting, the House Committee on Taxation, and the House Committee on Banking.

In 1993, he was a candidate in the Boston mayoral election. He finished second in the nonpartisan primary, but lost in the general election to Acting Mayor Thomas Menino. From 1980-81, Brett was the Assistant Secretary of Energy.

Recognition 
In 2019, Brett received an honorary doctorate from Beacon College.

References

External links

1949 births
Democratic Party members of the Massachusetts House of Representatives
Politicians from Boston
American University alumni
Suffolk University alumni
Harvard Kennedy School alumni
Living people
American activists
American chief executives